The discography of Geri Halliwell, an English pop music singer, contains three studio albums, nine singles, and ten music videos. In 1999, Halliwell launched her solo career and released her debut album Schizophonic, with the lead single "Look at Me", produced by Absolute "Look at Me" would go on to sell over one million copies worldwide followed by further number ones at the UK Singles Chart "Mi Chico Latino", "Lift Me Up" and "Bag It Up". "Look at Me" was released to radio in the United States in late 1999, receiving limited airplay. With only a radio single, Schizophonic debuted at number forty-two on the Billboard 200 before dropping out within the next month. The album was eventually certified Gold, distributing over 500,000 copies. "Mi Chico Latino" did not have a big impact on American radio, and no further singles from Schizophonic or albums were released in the United States.

In 2001, Halliwell followed up with her second album, Scream If You Wanna Go Faster. It also included her cover version of the Weather Girls' 1983 hit, "It's Raining Men", used on the Bridget Jones's Diary film soundtrack. The song also won her the International Song of the Year award at the 2002 NRJ Music Awards. The singles that followed, "Scream If You Wanna Go Faster" and "Calling", reached, respectively, number eight and number seven in the United Kingdom. Halliwell released a special French edition of the single, entitled "Au Nom de L'amour".

In late 2004, Halliwell made a return to music with the single "Ride It", which reached number four in the United Kingdom and number one on the dance chart. However, several months elapsed before another single was released, during which time she was apparently instructed to record some new tracks for the as yet unreleased album by her record company, which was unhappy with the set list. The second single, "Desire", was released on 30 May 2005, reaching number 22 in the UK Singles Chart and number one on the UK Dance Chart. Released shortly after, the album Passion similarly received little attention from the public or critics, and stalled at number 41 on the UK Albums Chart. Halliwell's recording contract with EMI was subsequently not renewed, and in interviews Halliwell stated that she was not interested in recording another album at that time.

In February 2012, Halliwell confirmed she had been in the studio recording her fourth album since early 2011, and was nearly finished the collection. In 2012, Halliwell premiered a new single "Phenomenal Woman". A new album was expected for release in late 2013, but did ultimately not surface despite the release of another new song entitled "Half of Me", which was released in Australia.

Albums

Studio albums

Compilations

Extended plays

Singles

As main artist

As featured artist

Promotional singles

Other appearances

Music videos

Notes

References

General

 [ "Geri Halliwell > Discography"]. AllMusic. Retrieved 13 July 2008.

External links
 
 

Discographies of British artists
Pop music discographies
Geri Halliwell